The 1999 Akron Zips football team represented Akron University in the 1999 NCAA Division I-A football season; they competed in the Mid-American Conference. They were led by fifth–year head coach Lee Owens. The Zips played their home games at the Rubber Bowl in Akron, Ohio. They outscored their opponents 315–314 and finished with a record of 7 wins and 4 losses (7–4).

The Zips spoiled Navy's Homecoming October 23, winning 35–29, after trailing 23–0.

Schedule

References

Akron
Akron Zips football seasons
Akron Zips football